Norman Edwin Phillips (September 20, 1944 – September 20, 2017) was a middle relief pitcher in Major League Baseball who played briefly for the Boston Red Sox during the  season. 

The Ardmore, Oklahoma, native grew up in Portland, Maine, where he graduated from Deering High School. He attended Colby College, and in 1963 he played collegiate summer baseball for Chatham of the Cape Cod Baseball League. He was selected by the Red Sox in the 16th round of the 1966 MLB Draft.

In 18 relief appearances with Boston, Phillips posted a 0–2 record with a 5.32 ERA without a save, giving up 14 runs on 29 hits and 10 walks while striking out 23 in  innings of work.

He died of cancer on his 73rd birthday, September 20, 2017.

See also
1970 Boston Red Sox season
Boston Red Sox all-time roster
List of Colby College people

References

External links
Baseball Reference
Retrosheet

1944 births
2017 deaths
Baseball players from Oklahoma
Boston Red Sox players
Chatham Anglers players
Colby Mules baseball players
Deaths from cancer in Maine
Deering High School alumni
Greenville Red Sox players
Louisville Colonels (minor league) players
Major League Baseball pitchers
Oneonta Red Sox players
Pawtucket Red Sox players
People from Ardmore, Oklahoma
Pittsfield Red Sox players
Sportspeople from Portland, Maine
Winston-Salem Red Sox players